Achromobacter insolitus is a Gram-negative, oxidase- and catalase-positive bacterium from the genus Achromobacter which was isolated from various human clinical samples.

References

External links
Type strain of Achromobacter insolitus at BacDive -  the Bacterial Diversity Metadatabase

Burkholderiales
Bacteria described in 2003